Triclofos is a sedative drug used rarely for treating insomnia.

Triclofos is a prodrug which is metabolised in the liver into the active drug trichloroethanol. The half-life of triclofos is fairly long and it may cause drowsiness the next day. Trichloroethanol may cause liver damage and triclofos should not be used for extended periods.

Triclofos is no longer available in the United States.

Side effects
Side effects may include: headache, rash, dizziness, flatulence, confusion, nightmares, dependence, diarrhoea, constipation, nausea, vomiting, abdominal pain, and ataxia.

References

Sedatives
Prodrugs
Organochlorides
GABAA receptor positive allosteric modulators
Glycine receptor agonists
Organophosphates
Trichloromethyl compounds